The 12th Pan American Games were held in Winnipeg, Manitoba, Canada from 23 July to 8 August 1999. Antigua and Barbuda competed for the sixth time at the Pan American Games.

Results by event

See also
Antigua and Barbuda at the 2000 Summer Olympics

References

Nations at the 1999 Pan American Games
Pan American Games
1999